Nicholas James Timothy  (born March 1980) is a British political adviser. He served as Joint Downing Street Chief of Staff, alongside Fiona Hill, to Prime Minister Theresa May, until his resignation in the wake of the 2017 general election.

Early life
Timothy was born in Birmingham, the son of a steel worker and a school secretary. He was educated at King Edward VI Grammar School in Aston, Birmingham, and at the University of Sheffield, where he gained a first in politics.

He has cited as his inspiration in politics the Birmingham-born Liberal politician Joseph Chamberlain, of whom he wrote a short biography for the Conservative History Group. He has supported conservative philosophies which he believes benefit poorer people and has suggested the Conservative party should focus on benefiting all citizens.

Career

Early posts
Following his graduation, Timothy worked at the Conservative Research Department (CRD) for three years, from 2001 to 2004. In 2004, Timothy left the Conservative Research Department to work as corporate affairs adviser for the Corporation of London. In 2005, Timothy took up a post as a policy adviser for the Association of British Insurers. In 2006, Timothy returned to politics after two years in the financial sector, spending a year working for Theresa May - the first of three posts on May's staff. In 2007, Timothy returned to the CRD, where he worked for a further three years.

Home Office
In 2010, Theresa May was appointed Secretary of State at the Home Office and appointed Timothy as a special adviser. He spent five years working for the Home Secretary, before leaving, in 2015, to become a Director at the New Schools Network (NSN).

New Schools Network
While at the NSN he spoke in favour of ending the 50% Rule which requires oversubscribed Free Schools to allocate half of their places without reference to faith.

In 2015, Timothy wrote an article to express his worry that the People's Republic of China was effectively buying Britain's silence on allegations of Chinese human rights abuse and opposing China's involvement in sensitive sectors such as the Hinkley Point C nuclear power station. He criticised David Cameron and George Osborne for "selling our national security to China" and asserted that "the Government seems intent on ignoring the evidence and presumably the advice of the security and intelligence agencies." He warned that security experts were worried that the Chinese could use their role in the programme to build weaknesses into computer systems which would allow them to shut down Britain's energy production at will and argued that "no amount of trade and investment should justify allowing a hostile state easy access to the country's critical national infrastructure."

In October 2016, the Health Service Journal rated him as the fifth most influential person in the English NHS in 2016.

Timothy has stated that he voted to leave the European Union in the 2016 membership referendum.

Downing Street
Following David Cameron's resignation as Prime Minister in the wake of the Brexit referendum result, Timothy took a sabbatical from his position at the NSN to work on Theresa May's 2016 leadership campaign. May's campaign was a success and Timothy was appointed Joint Chief of Staff to the Prime Minister on 14 July 2016.

In spring 2017, May called a snap general election. As a result of the election, the Conservative Party lost its majority and became a minority government dependent on the Democratic Unionist Party for their majority. Timothy, along with Fiona Hill, faced immediate calls for his removal. Theresa May was also given an ultimatum by Conservative Members of Parliament, to sack Timothy or face her own leadership challenge.

On 9 June 2017, Timothy resigned as Joint Chief of Staff to the Prime Minister. He, along with Hill, had been blamed by members of the Conservative Party for a disastrous campaign, which resulted in May losing a 20-point lead in the polls.
Reflecting in 2020 on the projected cost of adult social care, Timothy wrote "Many things went wrong in that election campaign, but I resigned as joint Chief of Staff in Downing Street because our social care proposal blew up the manifesto."

Journalism
Since leaving Downing Street, Timothy has worked as a columnist for  The Daily Telegraph newspaper.

Brexit and allegations of antisemitism
In February 2018, Timothy denied allegations of antisemitism following the publication of an article of which he was the principal author that claimed the existence of a  "secret plot" to stop Brexit by the Jewish philanthropist George Soros. In response, Timothy tweeted: "Throughout my career I’ve campaigned against antisemitism, helped secure more funding for security at synagogues and Jewish schools".

2019 general election
In November 2019, Timothy failed in a bid to be selected as the Conservative candidate for the Meriden constituency in the West Midlands, for the 2019 general election. The seat had previously been held by Dame Caroline Spelman, who opted to stand down as an MP and candidate over the "intensity of abuse arising out of Brexit".

2022 Commonwealth Games
In January 2019 Timothy was appointed as a member of the organising committee of the 2022 Commonwealth Games, to be held in his home city of Birmingham.

The Trojan Horse Scandal
In February 2022, The New York Times released a podcast entitled "The Trojan Horse Affair" which was created by Brian Reed and Hamza Syed. The podcast shed light on Nick Timothy's contribution to the scandal when he emailed a Birmingham community centre which was due to host an event entitled "Trojan Horse or Trojan Hoax" in order to shut down the event. In the email it is alleged that Nick insinuated that the owners of the community centre would be associated with terrorism if they allowed the event to go ahead, and references an article Nick Timothy himself wrote.

References

External links
 Twitter feed
 Columns by Timothy for ConservativeHome

Living people
1980 births
British political consultants
Conservative Party (UK) people
People from Birmingham, West Midlands
Alumni of the University of Sheffield
British special advisers
Commanders of the Order of the British Empire
Downing Street Chiefs of Staff